Express FM is a private Tunisian radio station specializing in economics which was founded on October 21, 2010 by Mourad Gueddiche and Naoufel Ben Rayana, co-founders of Maghreb Productions Communication (MPC). Express FM is the fifth-launched private radio station in Tunisia.

Key people 
 Karim Benamor, Head of Programming
 Najoua Rahoui, General Manager

See also 
 Shems FM

References

External links 
 

Radio stations in Tunisia